Jamie Kern Lima (née Jamie Marie Kern) is an American entrepreneur, investor and media personality. She is  recognized as the co-founder of IT Cosmetics and the first female chief executive officer of a L'Oréal brand in the company's history. In 2016, Kern Lima sold IT Cosmetics to L'Oréal for $1.2 billion and has been included on the Forbes' list of "America's Richest Self-Made Women" since 2017.

Early life 
Kern Lima was the first member of her family to attend college and went to Washington State University, where she graduated valedictorian. She received her Master of Business Administration from Columbia Business School in 2004. During college, she was a waitress at Denny's and bagged groceries at Safeway.

Business career
In 2008, Kern Lima co-founded IT Cosmetics after having difficulties with makeup products due to rosacea and hyperpigmentation. The business struggled over the following years as beauty retailers rejected her products. Kern Lima was featured on a 10-minute QVC segment in which she wiped her makeup off, revealing her bare face to illustrate the use of IT Cosmetics concealers. All products sold out by the end of the segment.

By 2015, the company had more than $182 million in net sales. She appeared in more than 1,000 live QVC shows, where IT Cosmetics became the largest beauty brand on QVC's network. It was acquired by L'Oréal for $1.2 billion in 2016. Kern Lima remained with the company upon the acquisition and was the first female chief executive officer of a L'Oréal brand. In August 2019, Kern Lima announced on Instagram that she would be leaving the company. Kern Lima has been included on the Forbes' list of "America's Richest Self-Made Women" since 2017 and the third youngest on the list behind Taylor Swift and Beyoncé.

Media appearances
Kern Lima won the Baywatch College Search in 1999, and appeared on an episode of the television series. She won the title of Miss Washington USA in late 1999 and competed in the Miss USA 2000 pageant held in Branson, Missouri. After considering a career in finance, she applied on a dare to be a contestant in the first season of the reality television series Big Brother. Kern Lima was the last female houseguest left on that season.

After Big Brother, she started her career as a morning news anchor at KNDU in Tri-Cities, Washington. She also worked as a field reporter and did live reports from Vatican City for KNDU in Kennewick on Pope John Paul II's death. In 2006, she left KNDU and moved to Portland, Oregon to work as a news anchor and reporter for KPTV.

Personal life
Kern Lima resides in Los Angeles, California. She is married to Paulo Lima and has two children.

References

External links
 
 Miss USA 2000 - Article at the Pageant News Bureau discusses Jamie Kern, along with other delegates. Web.archive.org

1977 births
Living people
American beauty pageant winners
American television actresses
American television reporters and correspondents
Big Brother (American TV series) contestants
Columbia Business School alumni
Miss USA 2000 delegates
Businesspeople from Jersey City, New Jersey
Miss Washington USA winners
People from Kennewick, Washington
People from the San Francisco Bay Area
People from San Rafael, California
Washington State University alumni
People from Des Moines, Washington
20th-century American people